G. W. Carver High School was a public high school located in Hahnville, Louisiana in St. Charles Parish, Louisiana, United States. It served black students on the west bank of the Mississippi River. It was in the St. Charles Parish Public School System.

History
G. W. Carver High School was a secondary racially segregated school located in Hahnville, Louisiana that opened in 1952. After the school closed in 1969, its students were moved to Hahnville High School.

See also
List of former high schools in Louisiana
Mary M. Bethune High School

References

Defunct high schools in Louisiana
Public high schools in Louisiana
Schools in St. Charles Parish, Louisiana
Historically segregated African-American schools in Louisiana
1952 establishments in Louisiana
Educational institutions established in 1952
1969 disestablishments in Louisiana